Şorbaçı (also, Shorbachi, Shorbachy, Shorbachy Pervyye, and Shorbanchi) is a village and municipality in the Hajigabul Rayon of Azerbaijan.  It has a population of 1,440.  The municipality consists of the villages of Şorbaçı, Birinci Paşalı, and İkinci Paşalı.

References 

Populated places in Hajigabul District